Clyde Godfrey Butts (born 8 July 1957) is a former West Indies cricketer who batted right-handed and bowled off breaks. Later, he became a team selector.

In a career spanning 14 seasons, he played 87 first class games, including seven Test matches for the West Indies between 1985 and 1988. The West Indies rarely selected spin bowlers when Butts was active – choosing instead to back their four fast bowlers – though he did play five matches on the Indian subcontinent, where teams traditionally select spin bowlers as the pitches are believed to suit them more. It was on the subcontinent that Butts got his best bowling figures, with four for 73 against Pakistan in 1986–87, including the Pakistani captain and all-rounder Imran Khan. Butts finished with six for 95 in the match, but couldn't prevent a drawn match and a drawn series. In his next tour of the subcontinent, to India the following season, Butts played three Tests and took two wickets, and that turned out to be his last series. In domestic cricket, Butts played 61 first class games for Guyana, and won three titles in first class cricket with the team.

"On the rest day of his Test debut in April 1985, [Butts] got married, though arguably, for an offspinner in that fearsome West Indies attack, most days were a rest day."

References

External links 
 

1957 births
Living people
People from Pomeroon-Supenaam
Guyanese cricketers
West Indies Test cricketers
Demerara cricketers
Guyana cricketers
Guyanese cricket coaches